The Rich Man's Eight Track Tape is an album by post-hardcore noise rock band Big Black. It was released in 1987 by Touch and Go Records. The album is a CD compilation of Big Black's Atomizer album (minus the song "Strange Things"), "Heartbeat" single and Headache EP. Atomizer is pictured on the cover artwork as an eight-track tape playing in a Panasonic TNT portable player.

The title of the album, and the liner notes by Steve Albini, show the band's low regard for compact discs, drawing parallels between the 8-track tape's fall from 1970s state-of-the-art favor, presaging the outmoding of CDs by newer digital media that would arrive in subsequent decades.

Reception

Track listing 
All songs written by Big Black, except where noted.

"Jordan, Minnesota" - 3:20
"Passing Complexion" - 3:04
"Big Money" - 2:29
"Kerosene" - 6:05
"Bad Houses" - 3:09
"Fists of Love" - 4:21
"Stinking Drunk" - 3:27
"Bazooka Joe" - 4:43
"Cables (live)" - 3:09
"Heartbeat" (Colin Newman) - 3:48
"Things to Do Today" - 1:44
"I Can't Believe" - 1:03
"My Disco" - 2:52
"Grinder" - 2:23
"Ready Men" - 3:51
"Pete, King of the Detectives" - 2:42

"Heartbeat" is a cover of the Wire song.

References

Big Black albums
1987 compilation albums
Homestead Records compilation albums
Touch and Go Records compilation albums
Blast First compilation albums
Au Go Go Records compilation albums